WLUG-LP (106.3 FM) is a radio station licensed to serve the community of Anniston, Alabama. The station is owned by Center of Hope, Inc. It airs a contemporary Christian music format.

The station was assigned the WLUG-LP call letters by the Federal Communications Commission on July 31, 2015.

References

External links
 Official Website
 

LUG-LP
Radio stations established in 2015
2015 establishments in Alabama
Contemporary Christian radio stations in the United States
Calhoun County, Alabama
LUG-LP